Yvonne Jeffries (previously Gregory) is a fictional character on the New Zealand soap opera Shortland Street. She was portrayed by Alison Quigan in a guest stint in 2004, before returning in a regular role the following year. She remained on the show until 2011 and returned as part of the shows 20th anniversary in May 2012.

Yvonne arrived alongside husband, Ian (Jeffrey Thomas), as the mother of lesbian nurse, Maia Jeffries (Anna Jullienne). Yvonne proved disappointed at Maia's sexuality and in comparison she was proud of her other daughters Libby (Fleur Saville) and Tania (Faye Smythe). Yvonne soon became the receptionist of the hospital and reestablished contact with the son she adopted out at birth, Hamish Flynn (Phil Brown). However Hamish later turned out to be a conman after her money. Following the death of Ian, Yvonne went on to have several more love interests, with the most high profile being that of Tania's ex-boyfriend, Ben Goodall (Shaun Edwards-Brown), who also ended up dying. Yvonne's maternal and kind nature saw her establish several core friendships on the show, primarily with Brenda Holloway (Katherine McRae), Gerald Tippett (Harry McNaughton) and Shobna Kumari (Leela Patel).

The characters high profile storylines and positive nature, saw Yvonne become a fan favourite character and the Jeffries family unit to be named one of the show's most popular set of characters.

Creation and casting
Alison Quigan was approached by producers to take on the roll of Yvonne, the mother of established character, Maia Jeffries (Anna Jullienne). Quigan was delighted at the idea of full-time acting and accepted. In 2010 Alison Quigan decided to quit the show and found it easy considering the recent departures of two of the three Jeffries girls, Tania and Libby, she stated; "The family had come to a finish. It was time for the show to move onto another family and me onto other projects." She later went on to state the family had "run out of steam" and questioned the number of affairs Yvonne was depicted to indulge in.
In January 2011 it was announced Yvonne was leaving the show. The storyline saw Yvonne accept a job offer from best friend Shobna Kumari and move to Australia. She made her last appearance on 9 February 2011. In May 2012 it was announced that Yvonne would be returning to the show alongside the remaining members of the Jeffries family to commemorate Shortland Street's 20th anniversary.

Storylines
Yvonne and her husband Ian (Jeffrey Thomas) visited their eldest daughter Maia Jeffries (Anna Jullienne) in November 2004 and Yvonne expressed concern at Ian's health. He was diagnosed with motor neuron disease. Yvonne returned the following year when she won the position of the hospital's receptionist. The son Yvonne and Ian adopted out at birth, Hamish Flynn (Phil Brown) made contact and Yvonne struggled to cope with Maia's sexuality. Yvonne and Ian separated when she announced her intention to never return to their farm home and she suspected him of having an affair. Ian and Yvonne reconciled shortly before he killed himself and Yvonne was shocked to learn Hamish was not her son at all but a conman. She later met her real son and his children. Yvonne had a short lived relationship with Sammy Diamond (Andy Anderson) and was devastated when she lost several friends to the serial killer dubbed The Ferndale Strangler.

In 2008 Yvonne started to date Fraser (Peter Daube) but was injured by his wife Deborah (Susan Curnow), who had Alzheimer's disease, and following surgery, developed cancer from a faulty skin graft. The cancer was removed but her relationship with Fraser ended when she discovered he planned to murder his wife. In 2009 Yvonne was disgusted to learn Maia was a killer and met Ben Goodall (Shaun Edwards-Brown) in a bank heist. Yvonne set Ben up with her daughter Tania (Faye Smythe) but by the end of the year, the two were in a highly controversial relationship themselves. Tania forgave Yvonne when she nearly died due to meningitis, but Ben unfortunately died from a brain hemorrhage. In 2011, Yvonne's best friend Shobna (Leela Patel) returned and offered Yvonne a job. In February, Yvonne departed alongside Maia and grandson Peter (Liam Sharma) to live in Sydney. Yvonne, Maia and Jay returned in May 2012 en route to a Jeffries family reunion for Yvonne's birthday. They ended up staying for a longer period when Libby's (Fleur Saville) husband Gerald Tippett (Harry McNaughton) suffered heart failure.

Character development

Relationship with Ben Goodall
In 2009, Shaun Edwards-Brown was cast as the role of Ben Goodall, a paramedic Yvonne meets whilst caught in a bank robbery. The two characters both survived the ordeal and Yvonne set Ben up with her youngest daughter Tania. When Yvonne organised a book group, Ben attended and Yvonne was touched by a short story he wrote to deal with the bank robbery. Ben soon dumped Tania and started to realise he was in fact, in love with Yvonne. Alison Quigan was shocked by the storyline and stated; "I thought she still hadn’t got over her relationship with Fraser McKenzie and was just biding her time with her family. I was surprised, I thought I was going to be spared this kind of storyline!" Though the feelings were mutual, Yvonne put Tania before her, Quigan explained the motive saying; "She knows Tania is vulnerable and has had boyfriends who have not treated her well." Yvonne also believed Ben had developed an attachment during the heist; "There are so many reasons why Ben and Yvonne could never be together, and she knows that. For starters, she would hate to hurt her daughter. She also believes that Ben is confused by the closeness that they developed during their bank robbery ordeal."

Faye Smythe (Tania Jeffries) believed if the two started a relationship, Tania would be disgusted but eventually deal with it, stating "They are a pretty tight-knit family and I think any girl can only go so long without her mum." Yvonne and Ben did eventually get together to much disgust in December 2009. Quigan believed the two were truly in love saying "I can see this lasting and I think that’s why they’ve fought so hard to make it happen." As the relationship progressed, the age gap became much more clear with Quigan explaining "Yvonne is extremely happy with Ben, and pleased that things are going so well between the two of them. So when she’s mistaken for his mum, it really takes her by surprise."Quigan thought the storyline helped her personally and enjoyed the chemistry between her and Edwards-Brown, stating; "It’s hard to deny your own personal insecurities as you get older. This storyline confronted me with the way my own body has aged, especially when I looked at myself alongside someone so much younger. I worried that it would look silly, but once we were working together, I realised that it’s just two people who really get each other. Shaun is a very generous actor, who makes it really easy. He’s a delight to work with. Ben proposed to Yvonne but she declined, favouring a party but during the party, Ben was knocked out by hooligans at a supermarket and developed a brain hemorrhage. Ben fell into a coma and never awoke, his life support was turned off in June 2010 and his organs donated.

Reception
Despite the characters constant drama, she quickly became a fan favourite. Writer Victor Rodger found Yvonne a particularly pleasant character to write for, stating; "I like writing for Yvonne very much, she sort of reminds me of my mum." The characters matriarchal archetype, saw comparisons to past characters; Marj Neilson, Barb Heywood and Moira Crombie. Quigan found the reaction to Yvonne's relationship with Ben interesting, stating; "I was quite surprised people had such strong opinions about it. Some were absolutely horrified but others are thrilled that she actually gets a young man. I have enjoyed Yvonne being at the centre of something and she’s had a lot of tears so it’s quite nice that she gets a bit of love."

References

Shortland Street characters
Fictional receptionists
Television characters introduced in 2004
Female characters in television